MSH may refer to:

Biology and Medicine
 Melanocyte-stimulating hormone, a hormone produced in the pituitary gland, and related to skin pigmentation
 MSH family of genes involved in DNA mismatch repair: MSH2, MSH3, MSH4, MSH5, MSH6
 Multiple system atrophy
 Mycothiol, an unusual thiol that is found in Actinobacteria

Transport
 Maharashtra State Highway, see List of state highways in Maharashtra
 Mossley Hill railway station, England (by National Rail station code)
 RAFO Masirah airport, Oman (by IATA code)

Organisations
Maison des Sciences de L'Homme, a research foundation in Paris, France
 Management Sciences for Health, an NGO that takes an integrated approach to building high-impact sustainable programs that address critical challenges in leadership, health systems management, human resources, and medicines.
 Markham Stouffville Hospital, a hospital in Markham, Ontario
 Mississippi State Hospital, a mental hospital in Rankin County, Mississippi
 Mount Sinai Hospital, Toronto

Other
 Masikoro language (by ISO 639 code)
 Marvel Super Heroes (disambiguation), an acronym commonly used by comic, arcade game and role-playing fans
 Microsoft Surface Hub
 Monad Shell, a former name for the Microsoft Windows PowerShell
 Mount St. Helens, United States, often abbreviated as MSH